Amanullah Khan was a politician in Hyderabad Old City. Khan joined the Majlis-e-Ittehadul Muslimeen in 1960. He contested from the Chandrayangutta Assembly segment for the first time in 1978 and won against the Indian Congress nominee, K. Baliah. Amanullah Khan retained the seat for five terms. He represented Chandrayangutta assembly constituency between 1978 and 1994. Four times he was elected as an AIMIM candidate (1978, 1983, 1985, and 1989) and in 1994 as an MBT candidate. Amanullah Khan retained the seat for five terms. He represented Chandrayangutta constituency between 1978 and 1999. Four times he was elected as an AIMIM candidate and in 1994 as an MBT candidate. In 1999 he ran as an MBT candidate, but was defeated 11,920 (6.2%) votes by AIMIM candidate Akbaruddin Owaisi. He was also the founder of Majlis Bachao Tehreek save majlis movement and was its president at the time of his death on 10 November 2002.

See also
 Majlis Bachao Tehreek

References

External links
69.16.252.177
http://www.siasat.com/english/news/10th-death-anniversary-mbt-founder-amanullah-khan-observed

2002 deaths
1950 births
Politicians from Hyderabad, India
Members of the Andhra Pradesh Legislative Assembly
Majlis Bachao Tehreek politicians